Hidrolândia may refer to the following places in Brazil:

 Hidrolândia, Ceará
 Hidrolândia, Goiás

Disambig-Class Brazil articles